Field manual may refer to

Military manuals
 United States Army Field Manuals
 Truppenführung ("Handling of Combined-Arms Formations"), the German army field manual

Other uses
 Field Manual, a 2008 album by Chris Walla